Sunshine Publications was based in Little Newport Street, London, England. The company first dealt with book publishing. In November 1983 it entered into magazine publishing with Micro Adventurer, which lasted for 17 issues. It also published Popular Computing Weekly, and later published Dragon User. During the boom years of personal computing in the UK, it published many books aimed at the hobby end of the computing market, and also made a short-lived foray into games software publishing.

References

Publishing companies of the United Kingdom
Defunct publishing companies
Defunct companies based in London